Alexander Valeryevich "Sasha" Kharlamov (born September 23, 1975) is a Russian former ice hockey player. Kharlamov was selected in the first round of the 1994 NHL Entry Draft by the Washington Capitals, though he never played in the National Hockey League. He instead spent his career between Russia and the minor leagues of North America, and ultimately retired in 2004. Internationally he played for the Russian national junior team at the 1994 and 1995 World Junior Championships. Kharlamov was also the son of Soviet player Valeri Kharlamov.

Career statistics

Regular season and playoffs

International

External links

1975 births
Bakersfield Condors (1998–2015) players
Hampton Roads Admirals players
HC CSKA Moscow players
HC Dynamo Moscow players
Metallurg Novokuznetsk players
Living people
National Hockey League first-round draft picks
Portland Pirates players
Russian ice hockey right wingers
Russian Penguins players
Russian people of Basque descent
Russian people of Spanish descent
SKA Saint Petersburg players
Ice hockey people from Moscow
Tacoma Sabercats players
HC Vityaz players
Washington Capitals draft picks